2023 Chinese FA Super Cup (Chinese: 2023中国足球协会超级杯) was the 18th Chinese FA Super Cup, an annual football match contested by the winners of the previous season's Chinese Super League and FA Cup competitions. The match will be played between Wuhan Three Towns, champions of the 2022 Chinese Super League, and Shandong Taishan, the winner of the 2022 Chinese FA Cup.

Match

Details

|}
|}

See also
2022 Chinese Super League
2022 Chinese FA Cup

References

FA Super Cup